Bilge Özgen (born in Viranşehir, Turkey in 1935) is a Turkish composer and lyricist. Özgen graduated from Ankara Boys’ Senior Technical School of Teaching in 1959. He received his first music instruction from his father Sabri Özgen, an amateur musician. Özgen met Vedia Tunççekiç and Erol Sayan while he was a student in Ankara, a period which he calls his "second period in music". He worked as an instrument builder for a while, and retired in 2000 from his job as a lute performer at Istanbul Radio. Özgen was encouraged as a composer by Alaeddin Yavaşça, Niyazi Sayın, Yılmaz Pakalınlar and Mustafa Erses. A composer of memorable works, Özgen has produced more than 300 pieces.

See also 
 List of composers of classical Turkish music

References

Composers of Ottoman classical music
Composers of Turkish makam music
1935 births
Living people
People from Viranşehir